Riodina is a Neotropical metalmark butterfly genus.

These butterflies are dark brown or black with white, yellow, or orange bars on both forewings and hindwings.

Species
Listed alphabetically:
Riodina lycisca (Hewitson, [1853])
Riodina lysippoides Berg, 1882
Riodina lysippus (Linnaeus, 1758)

References

Riodinini
Riodinidae of South America
Butterfly genera
Taxa named by John O. Westwood